The High End of Low Tour  was a worldwide arena tour by American rock band Marilyn Manson. It was the twelfth tour the band embarked upon and the eighth to span multiple legs. The tour ran from June 3, 2009, until December 21, 2009. The only known tour date of the tour's seventh leg in 2010 was cancelled. During the last show in France, Manson announced that there would be no further tour dates in 2010.

In the vein of the album themes and imagery revolving around Manson's conception of life as a movie, the live counterpart of The High End of Low reflects this theatricality by simulating each song in the live tour as a different act. Replete with cinema-derived stage lighting illuminating Manson, the separation between "backstage"/"onstage" has been lifted to portray this cinematic effect; Manson reapplies his makeup front-and-center onstage, stagehands assist with wardrobe changes in full view of the audience, and the final illustration of this concept is that prior to each song's commencement afterwards, a stagehand emerges and signifies that each new act has begun by use of a clapperboard in front of Manson, as if to convey the filmic mantra of "lights, camera, action" and the song begins.

A new theatric stage was revealed in the first European leg of "The High End Of Low Tour". During "Great Big White World" Manson performed in an oversized white lightbox. The song was entirely sung behind the semi-transparent sheet, removed from the audience. "If I Was Your Vampire", which also deals with a similar lovelorn isolation, was alternately performed with this theatrical device on early dates of the tour.

Marilyn Manson joined Slayer as headliners for the Rockstar Energy Mayhem Festival tour in 2009. The press release for the tour stated that "Manson is currently in the studio working on his seventh studio album scheduled for release May 18th on Interscope Records." On February 2, Rolling Stone confirmed the album had been officially titled The High End of Low.

After much fan speculation and no official announcement, Andy Gerold joined Marilyn Manson in the capacity of live bassist after former bassist Twiggy Ramirez switched to lead guitar duties. Gerold played his first show with the band on June 3, 2009, in Brno, Czech Republic. As of 2011, Gerold is still the youngest musician to play in the band, preceding former drummer Sara Lee Lucas by nearly seven years. During the summer of 2009, the band co-headlined the 2009 Mayhem Festival with Slayer. Later in October 2009, the band headlined the internationally advertised V-Rock Festival '09.

Performance and show themes

For most of the tour, Manson wore the same sleeveless black shirt with a razor blade image on the front, as well as his signature black skin tight leather trousers. For most performances of "Devour" or "Great Big White World", Manson wore a white coat. For some performances of "Great Big White World", Manson would rip his way out of a box sealed in a plastic wrap. For performances of "Dried Up, Tied and Dead to the World", Manson would play guitar. For performances of "If I Was Your Vampire", "Arma-goddamn-motherfuckin-geddon" " Running to the Edge of the World" "Leave a Scar", Manson used a microphone in the shape of a knife, as he previously used during the Rape of the World Tour. For performances of "Four Rusted Horses (Opening Titles Version)", Manson burnt a Bible, as he has notably done during past performances of "Antichrist Superstar".

For most performances of "Pretty as a Swastika" and "Arma-goddamn-motherfuckin-geddon", banners baring the dollar sign logo were on stage. For performances of "Irresponsible Hate Anthem", Manson wore a Nazi helmet and held the flag of whichever country he was performing in. Also for performances of "Pretty as a Swastika", Manson wore the hat of a Nazi officer. During the European leg, for performances of "Devour" and "Coma White"/"Coma Black", a large promotional photo of his room was used as a backdrop. During European leg, for performances of "Cruci-Fiction in Space", Manson wore gloves with lasers attached to the fingers. For performances of "The Dope Show", Manson wore a top hat. For performances of "The Dope Show", dialogue from the film, Walk Hard: The Dewey Cox Story, would play before the song was performed. The dialogue features talk and usage of cocaine. Also for performances of "The Dope Show" and "Leave a Scar", Manson made use of film projectors. During the performance of "Running to the Edge of the World" on Barcelona, Spain, Manson sang to Evan Rachel Wood, with the knife microphone, as she pretended to bleed to death, lying on a bed that had been set up center stage.

 For performances of "Irresponsible Hate Anthem", Manson wore a Nazi helmet and held the flag of whichever country he was performing in.
 Also for performances of "Pretty as a Swastika", Manson wore the hat of a Nazi officer.
 During The High End of Low European leg, for performances of "Devour" and "Coma White"/"Coma Black", a large promotional photo of his room was used as a backdrop.
  During The High End of Low European leg, for performances of "Cruci-Fiction in Space", Manson wore gloves with lasers attached to the fingers.
 For performances of "The Dope Show", Manson wore a top hat.
 For performances of "The Dope Show", dialogue from the film, Walk Hard: The Dewey Cox Story, would play before the song was performed. The dialogue features talk and usage of cocaine.
 Also for performances of "The Dope Show" and "Leave a Scar", Manson made use of film projectors.
 During the performance of "Running to the Edge of the World" in Barcelona, Spain, Manson sang to Evan Rachel Wood, with the knife microphone, as she pretended to bleed to death, lying on a bed that had been set up center stage.
 During the show on December 14, 2009, in Manchester, England, former Marilyn Manson live bassist Rob Holliday joined the band to play "Little Horn".
 During the show on August 25, 2009, in Pomona, California, Kerry King of the band Slayer joined Manson to play "Little Horn" and "Irresponsible Hate Anthem".

Set list
The most commonly played songs, in the order they were most generally performed, were:

"Intro"
"Cruci-Fiction in Space"
"Disposable Teens"
"Pretty as a Swastika"
"Little Horn"
"The Love Song"
"Irresponsible Hate Anthem"
"Four Rusted Horses (Opening Titles Version)"
"Arma-Goddamn-Motherfuckin-Geddon"
"Devour"
"Track 99"
"Dried Up, Tied and Dead to the World"
"Blank and White"
"Coma White" / "Coma Black (a) Eden Eye"
"Running to the Edge of the World"
"I Want to Kill You Like They Do in the Movies"
"We're from America"
"Leave a Scar" (contains intro from "Abuse, Part 1 (There Is Pain Involved)")
"The Dope Show" (contains intro from "Dewey Cox Cocaine")
"Wight Spider"
"Rock Is Dead" (contains intro from "Dancing with the One-Legged...")
"WOW"
"Great Big White World" (With "Fuck Frankie" intro)
"Sweet Dreams (Are Made of This)"
"Whole Wide World"
"Rock N Roll Nigger"
"If I Was Your Vampire"
"Tourniquet"
"The Beautiful People" (contains intro from "Baby, You're a Rich Man")

Broadcasts & Recordings

It Is known that Multiple concerts were captured during this tour, though all the material has been archived.

Tour dates

References

Marilyn Manson (band) concert tours
2009 concert tours